John Edmond Frill (April 3, 1879 – September 28, 1918) was a Major League Baseball pitcher who played in  and  with the New York Highlanders, St. Louis Browns and the Cincinnati Reds. He batted right and threw left-handed.

He was born in Reading, Pennsylvania, and died in Westerly, Rhode Island.

External links

1879 births
1918 deaths
Deaths from Spanish flu
Major League Baseball pitchers
Baseball players from Pennsylvania
New York Highlanders players
St. Louis Browns players
Cincinnati Reds players
Springfield Ponies players
East Liverpool (minor league baseball) players
Newark Sailors players
Newark Indians players
Jersey City Skeeters players
Buffalo Bisons (minor league) players
Toronto Maple Leafs (International League) players
Albany Senators players
Syracuse Stars (minor league baseball) players